Noureen DeWulf (née Ahmed) is an American actress and comedian. She is best known for her film roles in West Bank Story (2005), Ghosts of Girlfriends Past (2009), and The Back-up Plan (2010). She also starred as Lacey on the sitcom Anger Management (2012–2014).

Early life and education
DeWulf was born Noureen Ahmed in New York City to Gujarati Indian parents from Pune, Maharashtra, India  and grew up in Stone Mountain, Georgia. She was raised Nizari Ismaili Muslim. She has two sisters. Her older sister, Aziza, teaches law at Northeastern University in Boston. Her younger sister, Sara, practices law in San Francisco.

DeWulf attended Boston University's School for the Arts and studied international relations and theatre. After graduation, she relocated to Los Angeles to pursue a career in acting. She is fluent in Hindi, Urdu, and Gujarati.

Career

DeWulf began her acting career in the Academy Award-winning short film West Bank Story, where she played the lead role of Fatima, a singing and dancing Palestinian cashier who falls in love with an Israeli soldier. She has been working in comedic television series and films ever since. From 2009-11, she played recurring roles on NBC's Outsourced, TNT's Hawthorne and MTV's The Hard Times of RJ Berger, and appeared in the Lifetime miniseries Maneater.
 
DeWulf has been seen in a number of box-office hits, including Ocean's Thirteen (2007), and The Back-up Plan (2010). She starred opposite Matthew McConaughey in the romantic comedy film Ghosts of Girlfriends Past (2009), and played opposite Jeremy Piven in The Goods: Live Hard, Sell Hard (2009). She starred in The Taqwacores (2010), which premiered at Sundance Film Festival in 2010. She co-starred with Charlie Sheen in the television sitcom Anger Management, which aired from 2012 to 2014 on FX.
In 2014, DeWulf won Best Actress at the Comedy Ninja Film and Screenplay Festival for her portrayal of a murderous temp in the independent film Coffee, Kill Boss.

In 2014, DeWulf was ranked #93 in Maxim magazine's "Hot 100" for the second time (the first time being 2007), as one of the most desirable women on the planet according to the magazine's readers. In 2009, she was listed in the 'Top 30 under 30' for Nylon magazine.  In addition, DeWulf has appeared in pictorials in Details, Men's Health, Zink, Giant, and Complex.

In March 2015, DeWulf joined the cast of reality show Hockey Wives, chronicling her life with husband Ryan Miller, a goaltender in the NHL. The series follows wives and girlfriends of professional hockey players.

Personal life
She was previously married to artist James DeWulf.

On September 3, 2011, DeWulf married National Hockey League goaltender Ryan Miller in Los Angeles. The couple have two children.

Filmography

Film

Television

Web

References

External links

 
 

21st-century American actresses
Actresses from Georgia (U.S. state)
Actresses from New York City
American film actresses
American actresses of Indian descent
American television actresses
Boston University College of Fine Arts alumni
Living people
People from Stone Mountain, Georgia
American web series actresses
Gujarati people
American people of Gujarati descent
American Muslims
Year of birth missing (living people)
Khoja Ismailism